The simple station Avenida 68 is part of the TransMilenio mass-transit system of Bogotá, Colombia, opened in the year 2000.

Location

The station is located in northwestern Bogotá, specifically on Calle 80 with Carrera 68C.

It serves the Metropolis, Las Ferias, and La Floresta neighborhoods.

On the north side of the station, there is a Homecenter location. To the south there is an Éxito location. It is the closest station to the Metropoís neighborhood and the Cafam in Floresta.

History

In 2000, phase one of the TransMilenio system was opened between Portal de la 80 and Tercer Milenio, including this station.

The station is named Avenida 68 due to its location two blocks from that major road.

Station services

Old trunk services

Main line service

Dual services

Feeder routes

This station does not have connections to feeder routes.

Inter-city service

This station does not have inter-city service.

External links
TransMilenio

See also
Bogotá
TransMilenio
List of TransMilenio Stations

TransMilenio